Lyson may refer to:

Lyson (Λύσων), an ancient Greek statuary. His statue of the Athenian people in the senate-house of the Five Hundred is mentioned by Pausanias
Stanley W. Lyson (1936), Republican member of the North Dakota Senate
 Thomas A. Lyson (1948–2006), Sociologist at Cornell University and proponent of Civic agriculture
Tyler Lyson, American palaeontologist

See also
 Lysons